Oudenbosch is a town in the municipality of Halderberge in the west of the Dutch province of North Brabant. Oudenbosch is well known for its 'Basiliek', a Catholic church that is a smaller copy of St. Peter's Basilica in Rome.

History 
The village was first mentioned in 1275 as "silvam que vocatur Barlebosche", and means "old forest". The forest was cultivated from 1275 onwards by the monks of the Cistercian abbey of St Bernard near Antwerp. Ouden (old) was added to distinguish from Nieuwenbosch, a village which was lost in the St. Elizabeth's flood of 1421. Oudenbosch was located at an intersection of land and waterways which stimulated its development.

In 1837, the monastery boarding school St Anna was founded, and Oudenbosch became a Catholic centre. Oudenbosch was home to 1,945 people in 1840. In 1862, the first sugar factory was built in Oudenbosch, and it became a centre of the sugar industry.

The Oudenbosch Basilica was built between 1865 and 1880 as a replacement of the parish church. It was designed by Pierre Cuypers as a replica of St. Peter's Basilica, however the scale varies. The entrance was added in 1892 and is modeled after the Archbasilica of Saint John Lateran.

Oudenbosch railway station is on the Rotterdam–Antwerp line and was built in 1854. Oudenbosch was a separate municipality until 1997, when it became part of the new municipality of Halderberge.

Transportation
 Railway station: Oudenbosch

Notable people (born in Oudenbosch)
 Cornelis Andries Backer (1874–1963), botanist
 Jac. van Ginneken (1877–1945), linguist and Jesuit
 Marinus Jan Granpré Molière (1883–1972), architect

Gallery

References

Municipalities of the Netherlands disestablished in 1997
Populated places in North Brabant
Former municipalities of North Brabant
Halderberge